Geremie R. Barmé (born 1954) is an Australian sinologist, author, and film-maker on modern and traditional China. He was formerly Director, Australian Centre on China in the World and Chair Professor of Chinese History at Australian National University  College of Asia and the Pacific in Canberra.

Barmé is known for his scholarship on modern Chinese cultural history, his writings as a public intellectual in newspapers and magazines, and his work in the documentary films. These include The Gate of Heavenly Peace (1995), which depicted the spring on 1989 in China leading up to the events of June Fourth, and Morning Sun, on the Cultural Revolution. He is known as a non-native scholar who can research and write Chinese at the highest level.

His book An Artistic Exile: A Life of Feng Zikai was awarded the  Joseph Levenson Book Prize for Modern China, 2004. He was editor of the ANU based e-journal China Heritage Quarterlyfrom 2005 to 2012, and is the editor of China Heritage. In 2016, he founded The Wairarapa Academy for New Sinology in collaboration with sinologist John Minford.

Education and career
Barmé took his B.A. Asian Studies from the Australian National University, majoring in Chinese and Sanskrit, then studied at universities in the People's Republic of China (1974–77) and Japan (1980–83). When he first returned to Australia as a Lecturer in History, one of his first students was future Australian Prime Minister Kevin Rudd, whose support was important in funding the Centre for China in the World.
He edited the journal East Asian History from 1991 to 2007  In 2011, he gave the inaugural "China in the World" Invited Lecture at ANU, "Australia and China in the World: Whose Literacy?"

New Sinology
In an essay first published in 2005, Barmé called for a "New Sinology," which would be 
descriptive of a "robust engagement with contemporary China" and indeed with the Sinophone world in all of its complexity, be it local, regional or global. It affirms a conversation and intermingling that also emphasizes strong scholastic underpinnings in both the classical and modern Chinese language and studies, at the same time as encouraging an ecumenical attitude in relation to a rich variety of approaches and disciplines, whether they be mainly empirical or more theoretically inflected. In seeking to emphasize innovation within Sinology by recourse to the word 'new', it is nonetheless evident that I continue to affirm the distinctiveness of Sinology as a mode of intellectual inquiry.
The historian Arif Dirlik is among those who welcomed Barmé’s intervention as "an important reminder of the importance of language as the defining feature of the term."

Selected major publications

References

External links 
 Barmé, Geremie WorldCat authority page.
 Evan Osnos, Q & A Geremie Barme New Yorker (29 September 2009)
 Geremie Barme Archives China Digital Times Links to articles.
 China in the World Lecture - Geremie Barmé YouTube
 New Sinology 后汉学/後漢學  The China Story (ANU). A collection of texts and links on the New Sinology.

Australian sinologists
Academic staff of the Australian National University
1954 births
Living people